G. King Thompson (November 24, 1887 – May 12, 1979) was a justice of the Iowa Supreme Court from January 1, 1951, to June 30, 1965, appointed from Linn County, Iowa.

References

External links

Justices of the Iowa Supreme Court
1887 births
1979 deaths
20th-century American judges